The David Drummond House is located in Eau Claire, Wisconsin.

History
David Drummond was a Canadian immigrant who founded a number of businesses in Eau Claire. The house was listed on the National Register of Historic Places in 1974 and on the State Register of Historic Places in 1989.

References

Houses on the National Register of Historic Places in Wisconsin
National Register of Historic Places in Eau Claire County, Wisconsin
Houses in Eau Claire, Wisconsin
Queen Anne architecture in Wisconsin
Brick buildings and structures
Houses completed in 1888